In economics, shadow work refers to a special kind of unpaid labor. 
It includes assembling of goods that come "in pieces", self-checkout at super markets, and self-service at gas stations. Jobs that are necessary for completing a purchase that have been left to the consumers as a way of rationalising production and distribution.

In contrast, there is unpaid labor that is made as an expression of self subsistence or to give to others, all things you do without getting paid, such as building your house, making free computer programs or taking care of your elders.

The term was coined by Ivan Illich, in his 1981 book of the same title.

Craig Lambert, a former editor of Harvard Magazine wrote about the new trend towards unpaid "shadow work" in 2011 and followed up his research in a book called Shadow Work: The Unpaid, Unseen Jobs That Fill Your Day in 2015. In it, he itemizes many of the unpaid tasks ordinary people do now that others used to do, such as pump gasoline, bag groceries, make travel arrangements, and check baggage at the airport. He includes the rise of technology and robotics as forces leading to the growth of shadow work, and also includes such factors as crowdsourcing and parental over-engagement in their children's lives. He argues that downloading tasks to consumers takes away from their time and reduces the amount of casual social interaction in people's lives. It also limits the number of opportunities for low-skilled entry-level work (such as pumping gas).

See also
Carr–Benkler wager
Internship

References

Employment classifications